The 1999 Paegas Czech Open was a men's tennis tournament played on Clay in Prague, Czech Republic that was part of the World Series of the 1999 ATP Tour. It was the thirteenth edition of the tournament and was held from 26 April – 2 May 1999.

Seeds
Champion seeds are indicated in bold text while text in italics indicates the round in which those seeds were eliminated.

Draw

Finals

References

Doubles
Prague Open (1987–1999)
1999 in Czech tennis